The Hannah Arendt Prize in Critical Theory and Creative Research is a prize competition awarded annually to original essays written on topics at the intersection of art and creative research. Essay submissions engage a new theme chosen each year in the tradition of political theorist Hannah Arendt. The award was established in 2012 by the Master of Arts in Critical Theory and Creative Research at the Oregon Institute for Creative Research in Portland, Oregon. Competition is open to the public, and winners are selected by an international jury.

Past themes 
2012: 'The Visible, the Invisible, and the Indivisible'
2013: 'On Art and Disobedience; Or, What Is an Intervention?'

Past juries 
2012: Keith Gessen, Lewis Hyde, Atta Kim, Geoffrey Mann, W.J.T. Mitchell, Sina Najafi, and Jacques Rancière
2013: Claire Bishop, Judith Butler, Barbara Duden, Julia Kristeva, Heike Kühn, and Martha Rosler

Past winners 
2012: Rob Marks, "The Site of Imaginative Contention".
2013: First place: Stéphanie Bertrand for “Dropouts” and Nate Harrison for “Immanence of Intervention, Revival of Critique”. Second place: Marc Lombardo for “On Power, Truth, and Living Statues”. Third place: Arnaud Gerspacher for “Interventions”.

References 

Pacific Northwest College of Art
2012 establishments in Oregon